Theodore Lorber (October 24, 1906 – October 11, 1989) was an American fencer. He competed in the individual foil event at the 1932 Summer Olympics.

References

External links
 

1906 births
1989 deaths
American male foil fencers
Olympic fencers of the United States
Fencers at the 1932 Summer Olympics
Sportspeople from Zanesville, Ohio